Antico Dalton (born December 31, 1975) is a former professional American and Canadian football linebacker and defensive lineman. He was drafted in the sixth round of the 1999 NFL draft by the Minnesota Vikings. He played college football at Hampton University.

Dalton would also play for the New England Patriots, Berlin Thunder and Edmonton Eskimos during his professional football career.

He now coaches High School Football in North Carolina.

References

External links
 New England Patriots bio

1975 births
Living people
American football defensive linemen
American football linebackers
Berlin Thunder players
Canadian football defensive linemen
Edmonton Elks players
Hampton Pirates football players
Minnesota Vikings players
New England Patriots players
People from Eden, North Carolina
Players of American football from North Carolina